Rebecca Lynn Cardon (born June 10, 1975) is a film and television actress, personal trainer, and product spokesperson.  

Cardon appeared on several reality-TV shows — and in 2013 she self-published the book Breakups Blow! A Guided Workbook to Help You Break Free.

Background and career
Cardon grew up in Virginia Beach, VA., began acting at age five in television commercials. and set a national bench press record at age 17 for her weight class of 105 pounds and age category of 17- to 19-year-olds when she lifted 135 pounds.  After graduating from Norfolk Academy, she attended George Mason University, receiving a degree in broadcast journalism and a minor in theater.

Cardon received second billing for a role in Nice Pants, a 2001 twelve-minute short film directed by Michael Ansbach. In 2004-05 she was a contestant on the sixth season of the CBS television series The Amazing Race, finishing in 3rd place with her then boyfriend Adam Malis.  TV Guide reported that Cardon and Mallis were favored to win, but that frequent arguments between the two "seemed to hold them back throughout the contest."  Also in 2005 she appeared on one episode of the E! reality series Kill Reality, a series that followed filming of the film The Scorned, with its cast of former reality show participants.

From 2006 through 2008 Cardon appeared as herself in Bravo cable network's television series Work Out, receiving top billing for her 23 episodes.  The series received GLAAD Media Awards nominations in 2007 and 2008.  Her character was depicted as a trainer whose uninhibited flirtatiousness often got her into trouble when working at a gym/spa in Beverly Hills, California.  In the 2007 season 2 she was depicted as having a relationship with Jackie Warner, a fellow-trainer and owner of the spa.  In season 3 Cardon was depicted as petulant and jealous that Warner has moved on to another relationship.  After Ellen reported that for the show's three seasons Cardon "has remained one of the show's most popular and essential cast members." In 2009, Cardon appeared on the Women Leaving Men for Other Women episode of The Oprah Winfrey Show, with Winfrey interviewing Cardon about her relationship with Warner.

Cardon portrayed Christie, a hitchhiker, in the 2009 feature film Desert Fox – which was nominated for Best Narrative Feature at the 2009 Los Angeles Reel Film Festival.  In 2009, Cardon was interviewed on Sex Rehab with Dr. Drew, and in 2010 interviewed on the documentary series Reality Obsessed. In 2010, she was named Woman of the Week by a sports bra manufacturer.

The Amazing Race

The Amazing Race 6

In August 2004, Cardon competed on the sixth season of the CBS adventure reality show The Amazing Race with her ex-boyfriend at the time, Adam Malis. Despite both being Cardon and Malis physically strong, their constant arguing on the season, including over relatively mundane disagreements and inconveniences, lead them to struggle, yet the two reached the final leg of the race and finished in third place.

The Amazing Race 6 finishes

An  placement with a double-dagger indicates that Adam and Rebecca were the last to arrive at a pit stop in a non-elimination leg.
A  indicates that Adam and Rebecca won the Fast Forward.
 An italicized placement means it is Adam and Rebecca's placement at the midpoint of a double leg.
A  indicates that Adam and Rebecca used a Yield and a  indicates that Adam and Rebecca were on the receiving end of a Yield.

Roadblocks performed by Cardon are bolded 

Notes

Filmography
 Nice Pants (2001) as Lisa
 The Amazing Race 6 (13 episodes, 2004–2005) (TV) as herself
 Kill Reality (1 episode, 2005) (TV) as herself
 The Scorned (2005) (TV) as The Amazing Nurse
 Work Out (23 episodes, 2006–2008) (TV) as herself
 Soup of the Day (2006) as Zoe
 Desert Fox (2009) as Christie
 The Oprah Winfrey Show (1 episode, 2009) (TV) as herself
 Sex Rehab with Dr. Drew (1 episode, 2009) (TV) as herself
 Reality Obsessed (1 episode, 2010) (TV) as herself

References

External links
  Rebecca Cardon at the Internet Movie Database
 

1975 births
The Amazing Race (American TV series) contestants
George Mason University alumni
Living people
People from Virginia Beach, Virginia